Louise and Luise are, respectively, French and German feminine forms of Louis. Louise has been regularly used as a female name in English speaking countries since the middle of the 19th century. It has ranked among the top 100 names given to girls in France, England, Ireland, Scotland, Sweden and Wales in recent years. It last ranked among the top 1,000 first names for girls born in the United States in 1991, but remains a more common middle name.

Feminine variants
Aloisia: German, Italian, Spanish
Aloisie: Czech
Alojza: Polish
Alojzia: Hungarian, Slovak
Alojzija: Slovene
Heloísa: Portuguese
Labhaoise: Irish
Liudvika: Lithuanian
Lluïsa: Catalan
Loes: Dutch
Lou: English, French
Louella: English
Louisa: English
Louise: Danish, Dutch, English, French, Norwegian, Swedish
Louiza: Greek (Λουίζα), Kabyle
Louize: Dutch, French, German, English
Lova: Swedish
Liisa: Finnish, Estonian
Loviisa: Finnish
Loviise: Estonian
Lovisa: Swedish
Lovise: Danish, Norwegian
Lu: English
Luann: English
Luana: English, Portuguese
Luanne: English
Ludovica: Italian, Latin
Ludwika: Polish
Luella: English
Luigia: Italian
Luigina: talian
Luísa: Portuguese
Luisa: Italian, Spanish, Estonian
Luise: German, Estonian
Luisella: Italian
Luiza: Polish, Portuguese, Romanian, Russian (Луиза), Albanian
Luīze: Latvian
Lujza: Hungarian, Slovak
Lula: English
Lulu: English, German
Luyiza: Ukrainian (Луїза)
Ruiha: Māori

People with the name

Arts
Louise Blanchard Bethune (1856–1913), architect
Louise Bourgeois (1911–2010), French sculptor
Louise Cotnoir (born 1948), Canadian writer
Louise Murray (1854–1931), American local historian and museum director
Louise Nevelson (1899–1988), American sculptor
Louise Robert (born 1941), Canadian painter
Louise Schatz (1916–1997), Canadian-born Israeli artist and designer

Entertainment
Louise Abuel (born 2003), Filipino teen actor
Louise Beavers (1902–1962), African-American film and television actress
Louise Bourgoin (born 1981), French actress
Louise Brealey (born 1979), English actress
Louise Brooks (1906–1985), American silent film actress
Louise Fletcher (1934–2022), American actress
Louise Gold (born 1956), British Muppet performer
Luise Gruber (born 1982), Austrian blues singer-songwriter, professionally known as Saint Lu
Louise Harman, real name of Lady Sovereign (born 1985), British rapper
Louise Harrison, British actress
Louise Jameson (born 1951), British actress
Louise Lasser (born 1939), American actress
Louise Michaëli (1830–1875), opera singer
Louise Plowright (1956–2016), British actress
Luise Rainer (1910–2014), German-Austrian-American actress
Louise delos Reyes (born 1992), Filipino actress
Louise Redknapp (born 1974), British singer professionally known simply as "Louise"
Mary-Louise Parker (born 1964), American actress
Louise Labèque, French actress

Literature
 Louise Adler (born 1954), Australian publisher and academic
Luise Aston, German author
Louise Bogan, American poet
Louise Compain, French feminist author
Louise Cooper, British writer
Louise Erdrich, American novelist and poet
Louise Flodin, Swedish journalist and publisher
Luise Gottsched, German poet, playwright, essayist, and translator
Louise Granberg (1812–1907), Swedish playwright
Louise Hay, American motivational author and publisher
Luise Hensel, German religious author and poet
 Louise Mallard, a fictional character from "The Story of an Hour" by Kate Chopin
Louise Manning Hodgkins, American educator, author, editor 
Louise Herschman Mannheimer, Czech-American writer, poet, school founder, inventor
Louise Markscheffel, American journalist, editor, critic
Louise Chandler Moulton, American poet, story-writer, critic
Luise von Ploennies, German poet
Louise Rennison (1951–2016), English author and comedian
Louise Hammond Willis Snead, American writer, lecturer, artist
Louise Collier Willcox (1865–1929), American author, editor, anthologist, translator, suffragist
Louise Wareham Leonard, American author

Politicians
Martha Louise Black (1866–1957), Canadian politician
Louise Feltham (1935–2020), Canadian politician
Louise Hardy (born 1959), Canadian politician
Louise Thibault (born 1946), Canadian politician

Royalty
Marie Luise von Degenfeld (1634–1677), countess
Louise of Hesse-Kassel (1817–1898), queen consort to Christian IX of Denmark
Louise of Mecklenburg-Strelitz (1776–1810), the Queen of Prussia
Louise Mountbatten (1889–1965), the Queen of Sweden
Louise of Savoy (1476–1531), regent of France
Archduchess Luise, Princess of Tuscany (1870–1947), the daughter of Ferdinand IV of Tuscany and his second wife Alicia of Parma
Lady Louise Windsor (born 2003), youngest granddaughter of Queen Elizabeth II, daughter of her youngest son Prince Edward, Earl of Wessex and his wife, Sophie, Countess of Wessex
Märtha Louise of Norway (born 1971), Norwegian Princess
Duchess Luise of Brunswick-Wolfenbüttel (1722–1780)
Princess Louise, Duchess of Argyll (1848–1939), fourth daughter of Queen Victoria

Sports
Aristelle Luise Yog-Atouth (born 1994), Gabonese football player
 Louise Baxter (born 1983), Scottish field hockey defender
Louise Brough (1923–2014), American tennis player
Louise Carroll (born 1982), Scottish field hockey defender
Louise Christie (born 2000), Scottish rhythmic gymnast
Luise Krüger (1915–2001), German athlete who competed mainly in the javelin
 Louise Lieberman (born 1977), American soccer coach and former player
Louise Miller (born 1960), English high jumper
Louise Sauvage (born 1973), Paralympian (Olympian in the Paralympics)
Louise Vanhille (born 1998), French gymnast
Vilma Louise Abrahamsson (born 1999), Swedish football player

Other professions
Louise Arbour (born 1947), Canadian lawyer and diplomat
Louise Brown (born 1978), first human to be born after in vitro fertilisation, in the UK
Louise Charron (born 1951), Canadian lawyer
Louise L. Chase (1840-1906), American social reformer
Luise Hercus (1926–2018), German-born Australian linguist
Louise Jensen (died 1994), Danish murder victim
 Louise Macdonald, national director of the Institute of Directors in Scotland
Louise de Marillac (1591–1660), co-founder of the Daughters of Charity and Roman Catholic saint
Louise O'Sullivan (born 1973), Irish telecommunications executive
Louise Ravelli (born 1963), Australian linguist
Louise Reed Stowell (1850–1932), American scientist and author
Louise van den Plas (1877–1968), Belgian suffragist

Fictional characters
Louise, a character in the manga and anime series Attack on Titan
Louise the Lady of Violets, wife of the sage Lord Pent and a character in Fire Emblem: The Blazing Blade
Louise Françoise le Blanc de la Vallière, female protagonist in the light novel, anime, and manga series Zero no Tsukaima
Louise Brooks, one of the main characters in the BBC sitcom Two Pints of Lager and a Packet of Crisps
Louise Belcher, one of the main characters in animated sitcom Bob's Burgers
Louise Darling, a friend of Ruby with brown fur in Max & Ruby
Louise Grimsley Capice, long running character in the crime/mystery serial The Edge of Night
Louise Halevy, supporting character from the Gundam 00 franchise
Lighthouse Louise, a female snail from the SpongeBob SquarePants episode "Lighthouse Louie", used to be named Louie, but when she revealed that she has newborn baby snails, she became Louise
Louise Jefferson (nicknamed "Weezie"), neighbor of Archie Bunker in All in the Family and a main character in the spin-off The Jeffersons
Louise Mallard, main character from "The Story of an Hour" by Kate Chopin
Louise Sidell, the title character's closest friend in the Penny Parker books
Louise Maigret (née Leonard), wife of Inspector Jules Maigret. Fictional detective in novels by Georges Simenon

See also 
Lovisa
Lowiena

English given names
Danish feminine given names
French feminine given names
English feminine given names
German feminine given names
Swedish feminine given names

cs:Aloisie
de:Luise
nl:Louise
ja:ルイーズ